The Danish Union of Educators (PMF) was a trade union representing teaching assistants in Denmark.

The union was founded in 1974, and in 1983 it affiliated to the Danish Trade Union Confederation.  By 1997, it had 30,149 members.  In January 2005, it merged into the FOA.

References

Education trade unions
Trade unions established in 1974
Trade unions disestablished in 2005
Trade unions in Denmark